Martin is an unincorporated community in northwestern Allendale County, South Carolina, United States.  It lies along SC 125 northwest of the town of Allendale, the county seat of Allendale County.  Its elevation is 92 feet (28 m).  Although Martin is unincorporated, it has a post office, with the ZIP code of 29836.

History
The Allendale Chert Quarries Archeological District was added to the National Register of Historic Places in 1985.

References

Unincorporated communities in Allendale County, South Carolina
Unincorporated communities in South Carolina